Transwave is a French Goa trance act composed of Christof Drouillet (known as Absolum) and Frédéric Holyszewski (known as Deedrah).

Christof was raised in a classical musician family, though he never had training in music or electronic. First, he got involved in various new wave bands where he was the singer and the programmer. One day, he discovered the Techno music sound, and that changed his musical orientation. 
Also raised in a family of musicians, Frederic Holyszewski began his musical studies at the age of five, learning Transverse flute and piano. During his teenage years, he found inspiration in the electronic music of the day, including Jean Michel Jarre, Depeche Mode, Frankie Goes to Hollywood and Simple Minds. He bought his first synthesizer funded by working at night in bars as a pianist. After the split of his first rock band Vision Quest, in 1990, he started to work on his own with the help of computers.

Christof and Frederic met at a French Rave party and subsequently formed the psychedelic trance act Transwave in September 1994. Three months later, the first Transwave release (Datura EP) was launched on the small French label, Transpact. Over the following two years, Transwave released three albums (Hypnorhythm, 1995, Helium, 1996, Phototropic, 1996) and toured around the world, experiencing great success in the psychedelic trance underground and scoring an international trance hit with their track, "Land of Freedom." The group split after the D-mention party in Paris in May 1997. Christof and Frederic also released an EP called "Anjuna" under the name Kaledoid in 1996.

Transwave is known for its heavy use of TB-303 based effects.

Christof launched his record label 3D Vision Recordings in Paris in 1998, releasing artists as dancefloor oriented as possible, which became one of Psytrance most demanded labels. Also in 2010, he launched iBZ Recordings, more dedicated to Techno and Tech-House. Both are based in Ibiza....

Frederic ventured out and started his own record label and production studio, Questionmark RDS. In 1997, the label released his first solo album Self Oscillation under the name Deedrah which marked Frederic’s first break from the original psychedelic Goa trance sound he was producing before. Since then, label is closed down, but Dado focused since that on collaborating with his friends Dino & Shanti under the name of Krome Angels.

Transwave have reunited to perform again at the Boom Festival 2006 in Portugal and in the beginning of 2007 they have released "Backfire", a compilation of hits and unreleased tracks that have made Transwave. They have chosen the tracks after asking their Fans through forums and internet.

Discography

Albums 

 Helium (April 1996)
 Phototropic (18 November 1996)
 Backfire (12 January 2007)
 Frontfire (February 2009)

Singles and EPs
 Datura (1994)
 Hypnorythm (1995)
 Quasar (1995)
 The Outerspace (1995)
 The Rezwalker (1995)
 Land of Freedom (1996)

Techno music groups
French trance music groups
Goa trance musical groups
Musical groups from Paris